Epinotia contrariana is a species of moth of the family Tortricidae. It is found in China (Jilin, Heilongjiang, Guizhou, Shaanxi), Mongolia, Korea, Japan and the Russian Far East.

The wingspan is 12–24 mm.

The larvae feed on Astilbe microphylla, Spiraea betulifolia, Spiraea media, Spiraea salicifolia and Spiraea crenata.

References

Moths described in 1882
Eucosmini